Jerrold (Jerry) Sadock is Glen A. Lloyd Distinguished Service Professor in Linguistics and the Humanities Collegiate Division at the University of Chicago.  Inter alia, he founded the grammatical theory of Autolexical Syntax (aka Automodular Grammar).  He is primarily a theoretical linguist, having written a number of influential works on noun incorporation, morphology and pragmatics, but is also an authority on West Greenlandic Eskimo and Yiddish.

He received his B.A. in chemistry from the University of Illinois at Urbana-Champaign in 1965, and an M.A. in linguistics in 1967 and a PhD in linguistics in 1969 from the same institution.

Bibliography
A list of his works up through 2009 can be found in the preface to the Festschrift in his honor.

References

External links
Jerrold Sadock's University of Chicago home page

University of Chicago faculty
Linguists from the United States
Living people
Year of birth missing (living people)
University of Illinois alumni
Linguists of Eskaleut languages
Morphologists
Eskimologists
Fellows of the Linguistic Society of America